Potiatuca carioca is a species of beetle in the family Cerambycidae. It was described by Monne and Monne in 2009. It is known from Brazil.

References

Apomecynini
Beetles described in 2009